Kamal Siegel (born 1978 in Punta Arenas, Chile) is a Chilean musician  and digital artist.

His music was featured on an album produced by Grammy award-winner KC Porter called Temple of Light 

The compilation features one of the pieces from Kamal's album "First Steps" that he launched in 2005. The album (First Steps) was recorded and produced in Chile by  Faro Producciones and later self-published in the United States.

Shipped Games 

Supreme Commander 2 (Xbox) by Gas Powered Games
Pirates of the Burning Sea
NHL Rivals 2004
NBA Inside Drive 2002
NFL Fever 2002
Nancy Drew wolf of icicle creek (PC) by HER Interactive
Inside Pitch (Xbox) by Microsoft
Polar Pool (PC) by Wild Tangent
Nicktropolis (PC) by Nickelodeon

References

Press Coverage and other References 

El Diario Austral, Jueves 8 de Mayo 1997 A-8 "Nuevos Naipes Para el Arte Local"
Mukilteo Beacon, June 2, 2004 Pg 2 "Mecha-Teknarr takes on Mickey at the Point"
El Diario Austral, Miercoles 21 de Agosto de 1996 A-9 "El Talento en la Imaginacion"
El Diario Austral, Miercoles 2 de Abril de 1997 A-9 "Los Pintores de Menuda Edad"
El Diario Austral, Sabado 15 de Noviembre de 1997 A13 "Juventud, Realidad y Fantasia"
El Diario Austral, Martes 6 de Mayo de 1997 A-9 "Se Rompe la Vitrina en Temuco"
Atina Chile Press Release
Nightengale Publication Ad
Ebila Artist Bio

News About First Steps Album
Making of First Steps
Making of First Steps Video
Kamal guest lecture at Edmonds Community College to exchange students from Denmark
Pirates of the Burning Sea Credits

External links 
 Kamal's Music Website

Chilean musicians
Chilean people of American descent
Living people
1978 births